Vaginol is a chemical compound of the furanocoumarin class.  Its glucoside is apterin.

It has been prepared by the following reaction sequence:

References 

Oxygen heterocycles
Tertiary alcohols
Lactones
Furanocoumarins